Madd Circus is the fifth studio album by American electronic band Detroit Grand Pubahs.

Track listing

References

External links 

 

2010 albums